Lublin County is a unit of territorial administration and local government (powiat) in Lublin Voivodeship, eastern Poland. It was established on January 1, 1999, as a result of the Polish local government reforms passed in 1998. Its administrative seat is the city of Lublin, although the city is not part of the county (it constitutes a separate city county).

As of 2019, its total population is 154,760, out of which the population of Bełżyce is 6,504, that of Bychawa is 4,893, and the rural population is 143,363.

Neighbouring counties
Apart from the city of Lublin, Lublin County is also bordered by Lubartów County to the north, Łęczna County, Świdnik County and Krasnystaw County to the east, Biłgoraj County and Janów Lubelski County to the south, Kraśnik County to the south-west, and Opole Lubelskie County and Puławy County to the west.

Administrative division
The county is subdivided into 16 gminas (two urban-rural and 14 rural). These are listed in the following table, in descending order of population.

Lublin County in the Past 
The history of Lublin County as a separate administrative unit dates back to the late 15th century, when Lublin Voivodeship was carved out of eastern part of Sandomierz Voivodeship. The new voivodeship was made of three counties - Urzedow County, Lukow County and Lublin County, which had the area of 5812 sq. kilometers (as for mid-16th century). Apart from Lublin, other towns of the county were Kazimierz Dolny, Lubartow, Wawolnica, Kurow, Leczna, Konskowola, Belzyce and Parczew. Exact boundary between Urzedow and Lublin counties is difficult to establish, as it varied in different centuries.

Lublin County existed in its original form until the Partitions of Poland. It continued to exist also in the Duchy of Warsaw, Russian-controlled Congress Poland and Second Polish Republic, but its borders were subject to frequent changes, due to several administrative centers.

References

 
Land counties of Lublin Voivodeship